"No Way Out" is a song by the drummer and singer-songwriter Phil Collins from the Brother Bear film soundtrack.

Production
Two different versions of the song are placed onto the Brother Bear soundtrack. One is 4:18 minutes long and rock-driven, while the other is 2:37 minutes long and a more mellow keyboard-driven version.

Scene
The scene where the song is heard is when Kenai remorsefully admits to Koda that he killed his mother when he was a human. Koda runs away, heartbroken by the loss of his mother.

International versions
The song was also performed by Phil Collins in various other languages besides English, namely German, French, Spanish, Italian and Japanese.

Critical reception
GenesisNews said the song is a "compact...strong ballad" and reminiscent of older Phil Collins songs such as "I Wish It Would Rain Down" due to its "speed, harmonies and female backing vocals". Allmusic deemed it "forgettable ". Some critics were not fond of its use in the final film, as it drowned out the dialogue in what was supposed to be the movie's emotional highpoint.

Track listing
"No Way Out"
"No Way Out" (Radio Edit)
"No Way Out" (Instrumental)

Charts

References

2000s ballads
2004 singles
Phil Collins songs
Brother Bear
Disney songs
Songs written by Phil Collins
Animated series theme songs
Film theme songs
Song recordings produced by Phil Collins
2003 songs
Walt Disney Records singles
Songs written for animated films